Matteo Canali (Marino, 11 September 1998) is an Italian rugby union player.
His usual position is as a Lock and he currently plays for Petrarca Padova in Top10.

For 2020–21 Pro14 season, he was named as Permit Player for Benetton Rugby.

In 2018 Canali was named in the Italy Under 20 squad. On the 14 October 2021, he was selected by Alessandro Troncon to be part of an Italy A 28-man squad and on 8 December he was named in Emerging Italy 27-man squad for the 2021 end-of-year rugby union internationals.

References 

It's Rugby England Profile
All Rugby Profile
Ultimate Rugby Profile

Living people
1998 births
Italian rugby union players
Rugby Roma Olimpic players
Rugby Rovigo Delta players
People from Marino, Lazio
Rugby union locks
Sportspeople from the Metropolitan City of Rome Capital